Melelina Soline "Mele" French (born June 15, 1984) is an American soccer forward who played for the NWSL's Seattle Reign FC and W-League's Seattle Sounders Women in 2015. French was named the W-League's Most Valuable Player for the 2014 season while playing for the LA Blues, also known as the Pali Blues. She is currently the Director of Coaching at the Los Angeles Bulls Soccer Club, a youth soccer organization she co-founded with fellow soccer player Kelly Parker (formerly of the Canadian national team).

Career
Prior to joining Santa Clarita Blue Heat in 2016, French played for both Seattle Reign FC and Seattle Sounders Women in 2015, Pali Blues in 2013, helping the Blues win the W-League Western Conference on July 21 and the Championship on July 28, LA Blues in 2014 where she helped the team win the W-League Western Conference and the Championship on July 27 and was selected as the W-League MVP for the season, Vancouver Whitecaps Women after being signed for the Whitecaps’ 2012 season on March 29, 2012, Western New York Flash during their 2010 Championship season and 2011 season, German club SC Freiburg, Sky Blue FC of Women's Professional Soccer after being drafted 60th overall in the WPS 2009 draft, Ajax America, and Pali Blues in 2008, scoring two goals and two assists to help the team win their first W-League Championship on August 2, 2008 in Virginia Beach, Virginia, U.S.

College
In college French played for the Oregon Ducks for four years, scoring eight goals and three assists.

Coaching
French founded the Force Football Academy that develops youth soccer players in the Los Angeles region. She also created and is the Director of Coaching at Chelsea Soccer Club LA, which is currently known as the Los Angeles Bulls Soccer Club, after it officially became its own organization in 2018.

Personal life
French graduated from the University of Oregon in 2006 with a bachelor's degree in general business.

References

1984 births
Living people
Oregon Ducks women's soccer players
Women's association football forwards
NJ/NY Gotham FC players
SC Freiburg (women) players
Pali Blues players
USL W-League (1995–2015) players
American expatriate soccer players in Germany
American women's soccer players
American expatriate women's soccer players
Women's Professional Soccer players
Ajax America Women players